Joseph Bowers Rigets (March 10, 1930 – April 9, 2003), better known his stage name as Rod Navarro, was a film and television actor. He was the host of Tawag ng Tanghalan.

Navarro was known as a character actor for playing rich dons, villains and for being "mahangin" (show off), a trademark in film and television to which he was known for, notably as Don Facundo in the Philippine sitcom Beh Bote Nga.

A Retired Master Sergeant in the Philippine Constabulary, he himself was a sharpshooter, which was evident in some of his films during the 1960s.

Navarro also served as a Councilor / Vice Mayor in Pasig, a Radio anchor and was a top product endorser during his time.

Career
Navarro was known in the news industry and was known as the "dean of news commentators". He was a news anchor in DZMM-AM and a news commentator in DWAN-AM. He was also a broadcaster under the Radio Philippines Network together with other personalities like Noli de Castro and Joe Taruc.

Filmography

Death
Navarro passed away on April 9, 2003 due to prostate cancer.

References

External links

1936 births
2003 deaths
20th-century Filipino male actors
People from Manila